Larry Brunk (February 9, 1883 – November 22, 1956) was an American politician. He served as the State Treasurer of Missouri from 1929 to 1933.

References

1883 births
1956 deaths
State treasurers of Missouri
Missouri Republicans
20th-century American politicians